Omi is a Central Sudanic language, spoken in the Aru Territory, Orientale Province, Democratic Republic of the Congo, between the two rivers Nzoro and Lowa. It was once considered a dialect of the Keliko language, but requires separate literature.

References

Moru-Madi languages
Languages of the Democratic Republic of the Congo